The men's heavyweight event was part of the weightlifting programme at the 1932 Summer Olympics. The weight class was the heaviest contested, and allowed weightlifters over 82.5 kilograms (181.5 pounds). The competition was held on Sunday, 31 July 1932. Six weightlifters from four nations competed.

Medalists

Records
These were the standing world and Olympic records (in kilograms) prior to the 1932 Summer Olympics.

Josef Strassberger improved the standing Olympic record in press with 125 kilograms. Václav Pšenička bettered the Olympic record in snatch with 117.5 kilograms and Jaroslav Skobla set new Olympic records in clean and jerk with 152.5 kilograms and in total with 380 kilograms.

Results

All figures in kilograms.

References

External links
 Olympic Report
 

Heavyweight